George Robert Dawson (24 December 1790 – 3 April 1856), was an Anglo-Irish Tory politician.

Background and education
Dawson was born at Castledawson, County Londonderry, Ireland, the son of Arthur Dawson, who represented Banagher, Midleton and Newtownards in the Irish Parliament, and Catherine Tyrone. He was educated at Harrow and Christ Church, Oxford, where he became friends with Robert Peel, whose sister Dawson later married. He was called to the Bar at Lincoln's Inn in 1811.

Political career
In 1812 Dawson served as Peel's private secretary during Peel's tenure as Chief Secretary for Ireland. He was elected Member of Parliament for County Londonderry in 1815, upon the death of the incumbent Member, William Ponsonby. He served under Lord Liverpool as Under-Secretary of State for the Home Department from 1822 to 1827 and under the Duke of Wellington as Financial Secretary to the Treasury from 1828 to 1830. In 1830 he was returned to Parliament for Harwich, a seat he held for two years, and sworn of the Privy Council. He again held office as First Secretary of the Admiralty under Peel from 1834 to 1835. From 1841 to 1850 he served as Commissioner and Deputy Chairman of Customs.

At Derry, in 1828, Dawson made an important speech in which he advocated Catholic emancipation; the following year, under the Tory government of the Duke of Wellington, the Roman Catholic Relief Act 1829 was made law.

Family
Dawson married Mary Peel, daughter of Sir Robert Peel, 1st Baronet, on 9 January 1816. He died in 1856 leaving five children, including Robert Peel Dawson, also an MP.

References

External links

1790 births
1856 deaths
Tory MPs (pre-1834)
19th-century Irish lawyers
Members of the Parliament of the United Kingdom for County Londonderry constituencies (1801–1922)
People educated at Harrow School
Alumni of Christ Church, Oxford
Members of the Privy Council of the United Kingdom
Members of the Parliament of the United Kingdom for English constituencies
UK MPs 1812–1818
UK MPs 1818–1820
UK MPs 1820–1826
UK MPs 1826–1830
UK MPs 1830–1831
UK MPs 1831–1832